My Husband, the Economic Miracle is a 1961 West German comedy film directed by Ulrich Erfurth and starring Marika Rökk, Fritz Tillmann and Cornelia Froboess. The film portrays the economic miracle of the post-war years and its effects on German society.

The film's sets were designed by the art director Ernst H. Albrecht. Location filming took place in West Berlin including at Tempelhof Airport.

Cast
 Marika Rökk as Ilona Farkas
 Fritz Tillmann as Alexander Engelmann
 Cornelia Froboess as Julia, seine Tochter
 Heinz Erhardt as Paul Korn - sein Freund u. Fahrer
 Adelheid Seeck as Helene Grolmann - Ilonas Managerin
 Helmut Lohner as Tommy Schiller - ein Journalist
 Friedrich Schoenfelder as Dr. Bach - Syndikus
 Wolfgang Völz as Sekretär
 Marielouise Nagel as Sekretärin
 Georg Bastian as Freddy - ein Mitschüler Julias
 Heinrich Gies as Arzt

References

Bibliography 
 Wiesen, Jonathan. West German Industry and the Challenge of the Nazi Past: 1945–1955. University of North Carolina Press, 2004.

External links 
 

1961 films
1961 comedy films
German comedy films
West German films
1960s German-language films
Films directed by Ulrich Erfurth
German satirical films
Films set in Berlin
Films shot in Berlin
1960s German films